Birds described in 1898 include  Foveaux shag, Bismarck kingfisher, carunculated fruit dove, grey-streaked honeyeater, Sula jungle flycatcher, Lord Howe golden whistler, Raso lark, Santa Marta foliage-gleaner, Sharpe's starling,

Events 
Death of  Osbert Salvin, Oskar von Riesenthal, Frederick George Waterhouse, Alfred Hart Everett, 
Otto Finsch became curator of the bird collections at the Rijksmuseum van Natuurlijke Historie in Leiden.

Publications
Charles Dixon Lost and Vanishing Birds (1898)  online
Hans Friedrich Gadow Classification of the Vertebrata, recent and extinct Black,  London (1898) online BHL
Adolf Bernhard Meyer The Birds of Celebes (1898).online
Oskar Neumann, 1898 Beiträge zur Vogelfauna von Ost- und Central-Afrika. Die von mir auf meiner Expedition durch die Massai-Länder und in den Ländern am Victoria Nyansa 1892-1895 gesammelten und beobachteten Vögel. Journal für Ornithologie. Bd. 46, Nr. 2, S. 227–305.
Ongoing events
Osbert Salvin and Frederick DuCane Godman 1879–1904. Biologia Centrali-Americana . Aves
Richard Bowdler Sharpe Catalogue of the Birds in the British Museum London,1874-98.
Eugene W. Oates and William Thomas Blanford 1889–1898. The Fauna of British India, Including Ceylon and Burma. Vols. I-IV. Birds.
Oskar Neumann and Members of the German Ornithologists' Society in Journal für Ornithologie online BHL
The Ibis
Novitates Zoologicae
Ornithologische Monatsberichte Verlag von R. Friedländer & Sohn, Berlin.1893–1938 online Zobodat
Ornis; internationale Zeitschrift für die gesammte Ornithologie.Vienna 1885-1905online BHL
The Auk online BHL

References

Bird
Birding and ornithology by year